Zachary Jake Nicholas Purchase-Hill MBE (born 2 May 1986) is a retired English rower.

Purchase won an Olympic gold medal at the 2008 Summer Olympics in Beijing and a silver medal at the 2012 Summer Olympics in London. Both medals were won in the Lightweight Men's Double Sculls. He has also won three gold, one silver and a bronze at the World Rowing Championships.

Early life and education
Purchase was born in Cheltenham to Nicholas Purchase and Sara Holyer on 2 May 1986. Originally a competitive swimmer, Purchase started rowing in 1999 whilst a pupil at the King's School, Worcester. Whilst at school, he also passed Grade 8 on the Saxophone with a Merit.

Following school, Purchase joined the British Rowing team as a Junior rower.

Rowing career 
His main discipline was sculling with the majority of his international medals being won in the Lightweight Men's Double Scull with Mark Hunter.

In 2002, Purchase won his first international medals, a gold and silver at the Coupe de la Jeunesse and competed at the World Rowing Junior Championships the following two years. In 2003, aged 17, Purchase won the Fawley Challenge Cup at Henley Royal Regatta.

in 2005, Purchase competed at the World Rowing U23 Championships in Amsterdam where he won a gold medal. He entered the Senior World Rowing Championships three weeks later and won a silver medal. Both medals were achieved in the Lightweight Men's Single Scull.

By 2006, Purchase was a full-time member of the senior British Rowing, based in Caversham, Berkshire. The same year saw him suffer a ligament injury in his left wrist, which stopped him training between January – May. Regardless of this, his competed at the World Rowing Championships in Eton, Berkshire that summer and won his first World Championship title, achieving a World Record in the Lightweight Men's Single Scull.

Following his success in 2006, Purchase moved to the Lightweight Men's Double Scull in order to train for the 2008 Summer Olympics. Purchase achieved a bronze medal with Hunter in this category at the 2007 World Rowing Championships in Munich, Germany.

In 2008, Purchase went on to win an Olympic gold medal at the 2008 Summer Olympics in Beijing following an incredible season where Purchase & Hunter also won the World Rowing Cup.

Purchase won another two gold medals at the 2010 and 2011 World Rowing Championships, in New Zealand and Slovenia respectively.

He won his second Olympic medal (silver) at the 2012 Summer Olympics in London.

Life after rowing 
Since retiring from rowing, Purchase has taken part in a number of public events and TV shows, including Who Wants To Be A Millionaire, Friday Night with Jonathan Ross, Ready Steady Cook, Three Men in a Boat and A Question of Sport.

On 27 November 2008, Zac Purchase officially named an eight rowing boat at The King's School, Worcester in honour of his Olympic Gold Medal win.

He regularly gives motivational speeches and hosts away days for businesses, schools and charities. He is also a qualified Personal Trainer.

Personal life 
Purchase was appointed Member of the Order of the British Empire (MBE) in the 2009 New Year Honours for services to sport and collected his award in June of that year.

Purchase married long-term partner Felicity Purchase-Hill (née Hill), also a former pupil and rower at the King's School, Worcester, shortly after the 2012 Summer Olympics at St Paul's Cathedral in London. The wedding was covered by Hello. They have two daughters, born in 2015 & 2018.

Achievements

Olympics
2012 London – Silver, Lightweight Double Scull (bow)
2008 Beijing – Gold, Lightweight Double Scull (bow)

World Championships
2011 Bled – Gold, Lightweight Double Scull (bow) with Mark Hunter
2010 Lake Karapiro – Gold, Lightweight Double Scull (bow)
2007 Munich – Bronze, Lightweight Double Scull (bow)
2006 Eton – Gold, Lightweight Single Scull
2005 Gifu – Silver, Lightweight Single Scull
2005 Amsterdam – Gold, Lightweight Single Scull (U23 World Championships)

World Cups
2012 Belgrade – Gold, Lightweight Double Scull (bow)
2010 Bled – Gold, Lightweight Single Scull
2008 Poznań – Gold, Lightweight Double Scull (bow)
2008 Lucerne – Gold, Lightweight Double Scull (bow)
2008 Munich – Gold, Lightweight Double Scull (bow)
2007 Lucerne – Bronze, Lightweight Double Scull (bow)
2007 Amsterdam – Silver, Lightweight Double Scull (bow)
2007 Linz – Silver, Lightweight Double Scull (bow)
2006 Lucerne – Gold, Lightweight Single Scull
2005 Munich – Silver, Lightweight Single Scull
2005 Eton –  4th, Lightweight Single Scull

World Under 23 Championships
2005 Amsterdam – Gold, Lightweight Single Scull

GB Rowing Team Senior Trials
2011 – 1st, Lightweight Single Scull
2010 – 1st, Lightweight Single Scull
2007 – 1st, Lightweight Single Scull

2009 New Years Honours
MBE, Services to Sport

References

External links
 ZacPurchase.com 

English male rowers
British male rowers
1986 births
Sportspeople from Cheltenham
Living people
Olympic rowers of Great Britain
Rowers at the 2008 Summer Olympics
Rowers at the 2012 Summer Olympics
English Olympic medallists
Olympic gold medallists for Great Britain
Olympic silver medallists for Great Britain
Members of the Order of the British Empire
People educated at King's School, Worcester
Olympic medalists in rowing
Medalists at the 2012 Summer Olympics
Medalists at the 2008 Summer Olympics
World Rowing Championships medalists for Great Britain